The Prince of Venice Beach is a 2014 young adult novel by Blake Nelson.

Plot summary
The book follows a seventeen-year-old runaway named Robert "Cali" Callahan who is hired to track down other runaway youth. What should be a simple assignment quickly becomes something more when he finds and falls in love with Reese Abernathy who is hiding from more than just her family.

The books takes place around Venice Beach California. A place known not only for its gritty skate and surf culture but also for its large population of homeless and runaway youth driven there by the warm weather.

Published 
The Prince of Venice Beach was published by the Hachette Book Group in June 2014.

References

External links

American young adult novels
Novels by Blake Nelson
2014 American novels
Novels set in Los Angeles
Venice, Los Angeles
Little, Brown and Company books
Surfing in California
 Goodreads